Ebonshire - Volume 5 is the 26th album released by Nox Arcana. It is the fifth in a series of winter holiday EPs inspired by Nox Arcana's holiday music trilogy: Winter's Knight (2005), Winter's Eve (2009), and Winter's Majesty (2012), which are each set in a fantasy realm called Ebonshire.

Track listing
 Solstice Eve – 3:30
 Candles In The Snow – 3:03
 Winter Spell – 4:13
 Stars In The Heavens – 4:00

References

External links 
 

Nox Arcana albums
2017 Christmas albums
Christmas EPs
Christmas albums by American artists
New-age Christmas albums